George Sumner may refer to:
George Sumner (bishop of Guildford) (1824–1909)
George R. Sumner, bishop of the Episcopal Diocese of Dallas
George G. Sumner (1841–1906), American politician
George Sumner (artist) (born 1940), American oil painter and environmental activist
George Sumner (botanist) (1793–1855), American botanist
Heywood Sumner (George Heywood Maunoir Sumner, 1853–1940), English painter, illustrator and craftsman
George Holme Sumner (1760–1838), British member of parliament

See also
George Sumner House, Montreal on List of castles in Canada
George Sumner House, Massachusetts